Dastgerd-e Emamzadeh (also Romanized as Dastgerd-e Emāmzādeh and Dastgerd Emāmzādeh; also known as Dastgerd and Emāmzādeh Dastgerd) is a village in Dastgerd Rural District of Farrokhshahr District, Shahrekord County, Chaharmahal and Bakhtiari province, Iran. At the 2006 census, its population was 3,270 in 831 households. The following census in 2011 counted 3,261 people in 957 households. The latest census in 2016 showed a population of 2,810 people in 871 households; it was the largest village in its rural district. The village is populated by Lurs.

References 

Shahrekord County

Populated places in Chaharmahal and Bakhtiari Province

Populated places in Shahr-e Kord County

Luri settlements in Chaharmahal and Bakhtiari Province